John Boye Rasmussen (born 11 July 1982) is a Danish handball player, currently the goalkeeper of Danish Handball League side AaB Håndbold. He has previously played for Tvis KFUM

External links
 player info

1982 births
Living people
Danish male handball players
Aalborg Håndbold players